Dora Adele Shoemaker (August 13, 1873 – March 16, 1962) was an American educator, poet, and playwright.

Biography
Shoemaker was born in Philadelphia, Pennsylvania, August 13, 1873. Her parents were Rachel H. Shoemaker and Jacob V. Shoemaker, founders of the National School of Elocution and Oratory, Philadelphia. Dora's brother, Frank W. Shoemaker, was the head of the Penn Publishing Company.

She was educated at Friends Select School and the National School of Elocution and Oratory (Bachelor of Elocution and Master of Oratory, 1915), with further specialized instruction at the University of Pennsylvania. She received a master's degree at Marywood College (now Marywood University (Scranton, Pennsylvania).

From 1915, Shoemaker served as principal of the National School of Elocution and Oratory. Renamed the Shoemaker School of Speech and Drama, its course offerings included journalism and radio technique. Shoemaker headed the school until the late 1930s. She was also a teacher at Marywood College, St. John's Catholic Junto (Philadelphia), and Neff Dramatic School (Philadelphia).

She was the author of Out O'Doors (poetry book), A Patron of Art (play, 1776) and A Fighting chance (play). She lectured on literary subjects and elocution.

Dora Adele Shoemaker died at her home in Bala Cynwyd, Pennsylvania, March 16, 1962.

Selected works

Plays
 A Patron of Art (1776) 
 A Fighting Chance, Or, For the Blue Or the Gray: A Play in Three Acts (1900) (Text)
 The Girls of 1776: A Drama in Three Acts  (1905) (Text)

Poetry books
 Out O'Doors

References

External links
 Photo, "Happy Birthday to - - Dora Adele Shoemaker". The Philadelphia Inquirer. 13 August 1938. p. 8.

1873 births
1962 deaths
Writers from Philadelphia
19th-century American dramatists and playwrights
19th-century American poets
20th-century American dramatists and playwrights
20th-century American poets
19th-century American women writers
20th-century American women writers
American women dramatists and playwrights
American women poets
American school principals
Friends Select School alumni
Educators from Philadelphia
University of Pennsylvania alumni
Marywood University alumni